Phacellodomus is the genus of thornbirds, birds in the family Furnariidae. They are found in woodland, shrubland and grassland, often near water, in South America.

Taxonomy
The genus Phacellodomus was introduced in 1853 by the German naturalist Ludwig Reichenbach to accommodate the rufous-fronted thornbird. The genus name combines the Ancient Greek phakellos meaning "bundle of twigs" and domos meaning "house".

Species
The genus contains ten species:
 Rufous-fronted thornbird, Phacellodomus rufifrons
 Plain thornbird, Phacellodomus inornatus (split from P. rufifrons)
 Streak-fronted thornbird, Phacellodomus striaticeps
 Little thornbird, Phacellodomus sibilatrix
 Chestnut-backed thornbird, Phacellodomus dorsalis
 Spot-breasted thornbird, Phacellodomus maculipectus
 Freckle-breasted thornbird, Phacellodomus striaticollis
 Greater thornbird, Phacellodomus ruber
 Orange-eyed thornbird, Phacellodomus erythrophthalmus
 Orange-breasted thornbird, Phacellodomus ferrugineigula – formerly a subspecies of P. erythrophthalmus.

References

External links 

 
Bird genera
Taxonomy articles created by Polbot
Taxa named by Ludwig Reichenbach